Katsukawa Shunkō I (1743 – 1 December 1812) was a Japanese artist who designed ukiyo-e-style woodblock prints and paintings in Edo (modern Tokyo). He was a student of Katsukawa Shunshō, and is generally credited with designing the first large-head actor portraits (ōkubi-e). At 45, the right-handed Shunkō became partially paralyzed and ceased designing prints, although he continued producing paintings with his left hand.

Life and career

Shunkō lived in Nihonbashi Hasegawachō in Edo (modern Tokyo) and was a student of Katsukawa Shunshō—possibly the master's first.  His earliest known work are the illustrations to the book Talks about Debut Plays (Kaomise shibai banashi, 1766). From about 1771, he began to design yakusha-e actor prints, which he signed with a small jar-shaped seal that appeared next to a larger one by his master; from this he earned the nickname Kotsubo ("small jar").

During the 1770s and 1780s, most of Shunkō's prints appeared in the tall, narrow hosoban format.  In 1788 he began to produce bust portraits of actors, a style that was to become popular in the 1790s and has come to be associated with the works of Sharaku. Other subjects Shunkō depicted include sumo wrestlers.

Shunkō suffered a stroke at the close of the 1780s that deprived him of the use of his right arm.  He gave up designing prints and devoted himself to painting. He died in 1812 at age 70 and was buried at Zenshōji temple in Asakusa.  His Buddhist posthumous name is Shaku Shunkō Shinji.

Gallery

Other ukiyo-e artists called "Shunkō"
Several other artists are known in English as "Shunkō", although their names are not all written with the same kanji.  These other Shunkōs are: 
 Katsukawa Shunkō II (active 1805–21), better known as Katsukawa Shunsen
 Shunkō III (active 1824–37), better known as Shunbaisai Hokuei
 Shunkō IV (active 1802–32), better known as Shunkōsai Hokushū

See also

References

Works cited

 Keyes, Roger S. & Keiko Mizushima, The Theatrical World of Osaka Prints, Philadelphia, Philadelphia Museum of Art, 1973, 275.
 Lane, Richard. (1978).  Images from the Floating World, The Japanese Print. Oxford: Oxford University Press. ; OCLC 5246796
 Newland, Amy Reigle. (2005). Hotei Encyclopedia of Japanese Woodblock Prints.  Amsterdam: Hotei. ; OCLC 61666175
 Roberts, Laurance P. (1976). A Dictionary of Japanese Artists. New York: Weatherhill. ; OCLC 2005932
 

1743 births
1812 deaths
Katsukawa school
Ukiyo-e artists